Croydon Clocktower is an arts and museum complex located on Katharine Street in Croydon, London.

History
The venue, which forms part of the 19th-century Town Hall, was opened as an arts and museum complex by Queen Elizabeth II in 1994. A notable early success was the Picasso  exhibition in March to May 1995 named Picasso's Croydon Period.

The venue contains the Museum of Croydon, Clocktower Café and the Croydon Central Library. Other facilities which can be accessed from Croydon Clocktower include the David Lean Cinema, which offers a regular programme of art house and independent films, and the Braithwaite Hall, which is used for concerts, theatre and children's shows.

References

External links 
 Croydon Clocktower at Croydon Council
Central Library

Culture in the London Borough of Croydon
Grade II listed buildings in the London Borough of Croydon
Leisure in the London Borough of Croydon
Clock towers in the United Kingdom
Towers in London
Arts centres in London
Tourist attractions in the London Borough of Croydon
Turret clocks
Individual clocks in England
Towers completed in 1895